Three stripes is a trademark of Adidas

Three stripes or Three stripe may also refer to:

 Three Stripe Records, label of Smith & Mighty
 Three-Stripe Painter, name given by Arthur Dale Trendall to classical fish plate painter
 The Neo-Druid symbol of Awen
 Three Stripes (album), a 2017 album by R&B group, Bell Biv DeVoe

Fish
 Threestripe corydoras or leopard catfish, Corydoras trilineatus
 Three stripe damsel or whitetail dascyllus, Dascyllus aruanus
 Three-stripe doris, Chromodoris macfarlandi
 Three-stripe fusilier, Pterocaesio trilineata, a fish of the family Caesionidae
 Three-striped tigerfish, Terapon jarbua